Polonyna may refer to:

 Polonyna (montane meadow), a type of mountain meadows in the Carpathians
 Polonyna Chornohora, a mountain in the Ukrainian Carpathians
 Polonyna Beskids, a mountain range of the Eastern Beskids

See also
 Poloniny (disambiguation)
 Polonia (disambiguation)